Pavel Gennadyevich Yevseyev (born 28 November 1990) is a Russian football player.

Club career
He made his professional debut in the Russian Professional Football League for FC Zhemchuzhina Yalta on 20 August 2014 in a game against FC Chernomorets Novorossiysk.

He made his Russian Football National League debut for FC Shinnik Yaroslavl on 11 July 2016 in a game against FC Baltika Kaliningrad.

References

External links
 
 
 
 

1992 births
People from Khimki
Living people
Russian footballers
Association football defenders
FC Dynamo Moscow reserves players
FC Shinnik Yaroslavl players
FC Urozhay Krasnodar players
FC KAMAZ Naberezhnye Chelny players
FC Tom Tomsk players
Sportspeople from Moscow Oblast